Olson's petrel (Bulweria bifax), also known as the small Saint Helena petrel or the Saint Helena Bulwer's petrel,  was a species of seabird in the family Procellariidae.  It was endemic to Saint Helena.

References

Olson's petrel
†
Extinct birds of Atlantic islands
Bird extinctions since 1500
Olson's petrel
Olson's petrel
Taxonomy articles created by Polbot